American Eagle Flight 4184, officially operating as Simmons Airlines Flight 4184,  was a scheduled domestic passenger flight from Indianapolis, Indiana to Chicago, Illinois, United States. On , 1994, the  performing this route flew into severe icing conditions, lost control and crashed into a field. All 68 people aboard were killed in the high-speed impact.

Background

Aircraft 

The aircraft involved, registration  was built by the French-Italian aircraft manufacturer ATR and was powered by two Pratt & Whitney Canada PW127 turboprops. It made its first flight on March 7, 1994, and was delivered to American Eagle on March 24, 1994. It was operated by Simmons Airlines on behalf of American Eagle. American Eagle was the banner carrier regional airline branding program of AMR Corporation's regional system, prior to the formation of the fully certificated carrier named American Eagle Airlines.

Passengers and crew 

The captain of Flight 4184 was Orlando Aguilar, 29. He was an experienced pilot with almost 8,000 hours of flight time, including 1,548 hours in the ATR. Colleagues described Aguilar's flying skills in positive terms and commented on the relaxed cockpit atmosphere that he promoted. The first officer was Jeffrey Gagliano, 30. His colleagues also considered him to be a competent pilot, and he had accumulated more than 5,000 flight hours, including 3,657 hours in the ATR. There were two flight attendants, one of them was on the first day of the job.

Weather 
National Weather Service reports revealed low cloud ceilings and visibility under three miles in the area.

However, the report observation was made about 30 minutes after the accident.

Accident

The flight was en route from Indianapolis International Airport, Indiana to O'Hare International Airport, Chicago, Illinois. While holding, the plane encountered freezing rain, a dangerous icing condition in which supercooled droplets rapidly cause intense ice buildup. The pilots were then ordered to enter another hold. During the descent, a sound indicating an overspeed warning caused by the extended flaps was heard in the cockpit. After the pilot took action by retracting the flaps, the pitch attitude and angle of attack of the airplane increased, followed by a sharp, uncommanded roll excursion that disengaged the autopilot. Flight recorder data showed that the aircraft rolled 77 degrees to the right, and the ailerons moved to a neutral position and the plane began rolling back toward wings level. However, another right-aileron deflection occurred as the bank angle was decreasing through 59 degrees, bringing the plane completely inverted. Throughout this roll, the data recorder showed that the first officer was sustaining nose-up elevator inputs. After the aircraft completed a full right roll and passed through a wings-level attitude, the ailerons were deflected toward the left and the roll was stopped at 144 degrees of right bank. The pilots rolled the airplane to the left, and as the bank angle decreased through 90 degrees, they applied nose-up elevator to stop the downward pitch, as the plane had reached a 73-degree nose-down attitude. By this point, the airplane was descending through . The airplane's ground-proximity warning system began to sound, followed by an expletive from the first officer and a rapid increase in nose-up elevator. A loud "crunching" sound was heard shortly before the end of the cockpit voice recording. The airplane crashed into a wet soybean field, partially inverted, in a nose-down attitude.

There was no fire. The distribution of wreckage, combined with data from the flight recorders, indicated that the horizontal stabilizer and outboard sections of both wings separated from the airplane prior to impact, "in close proximity to the ground." As the bodies of all on board were fragmented by the impact forces, the crash site was declared a biohazard.

Flight 4184 was the first hull loss, and was also tied with Aero Caribbean Flight 883 as the deadliest aviation accident involving an ATR 72 aircraft, until Yeti Airlines Flight 691 crashed 29 years later.

Probable cause
In its report, the National Transportation Safety Board (NTSB) found that the aircraft manufacturer ATR, the French Directorate General for Civil Aviation (the French counterpart of the American FAA) and the FAA itself had each contributed to the accident by failing to achieve the highest possible level of safety.

The unabridged NTSB probable cause statement reads:

BEA response and investigation 

The French Bureau of Enquiry and Analysis for Civil Aviation Safety (BEA) made its own separate investigation and agreed with the NTSB's cause of the accident as aileron deflection leading to loss of control. However, the BEA stated in its response to the NTSB's report that the aileron deflection was caused by pilot error instead of by ice, citing several off-topic conversations made by the crew during the holding phase as well as the flight crew's extension of the flaps to 15 degrees while at a high speed, which can create large axial loads. The BEA also stated that the air-traffic controller was not adequately monitoring the flight. However, the NTSB refuted the BEA's arguments in its final report and in a separate detailed response article. In addition, there was no factual evidence to support the BEA's claims. The NTSB stated that the crew's conversation took place at a non-critical moment of the flight and that the pilots were aware of the ice on the wings. Therefore, the NTSB concluded that the non-pertinent conversation did not contribute to the accident.

Aftermath

In March 1995, some families of the victims discovered remains of their loved ones at the accident site, giving rise to a suspicion that cleanup efforts were not thorough. In a statement, the Newton County coroner – referring to other comments made – said he was not surprised there were remains left, given how serious the accident was.

In April 1996 the FAA issued 18 Airworthiness Directives (ADs) affecting 29 turboprop aircraft having the combination of unpowered flight controls, pneumatic deicing boots and NACA "five-digit sharp-stall" airfoils. They included significant revisions of pilot operating procedures in icing conditions (higher minimum speeds, manual control and different upset recovery procedures) as well as physical changes to the coverage area of the deicing boots on the airfoils.

In the years following the accident, AMR stopped flying its American Eagle ATRs out of its northern hubs and moved them to its southern and Caribbean hubs at Dallas/Fort Worth International Airport, Miami, Florida and San Juan, Puerto Rico to reduce potential icing problems in the future. Other American ATR operators, particularly Atlantic Southeast Airlines, operated ATR 72 aircraft in areas where icing conditions were not common.

While the ATR 42 and ATR 72 aircraft are now compliant with all icing-condition requirements imposed by those 18 ADs, the deicing boots still only reach back to 12.5% of the chord. Prior to the accident, they had extended only to 5% and 7%, respectively. Robert Boser believes the ADs still fail to deal with the findings of tests conducted by British regulators at MoD Boscombe Down, which demonstrated that ice could form as far back on the wing as 23% of the chord, and on the tail at 30% of the chord. Both percentages are well beyond the reach of the extended deicing boots installed in compliance with the FAA ADs. Those tests limited the size of the droplets to 40 micrometres, near the maximum limit of the FAA design certification rules for Transport Category aircraft (Part 25, Appendix C), still in effect at that time of the Roselawn crash. "Extensive airborne testing" following the accident revealed that airliners can encounter water droplets exceeding 200 micrometers in average diameter. It is likely that the lack of further ATR icing accidents during the 1990s is attributable to the changes in pilot operating procedures, as well as the moving of those aircraft to operating areas where severe icing is not a problem, rather than to the modest extension of the deicing boots to 12.5% of the chord.

Three ATR 72s have since crashed because of icing. TransAsia Airways Flight 791 crashed on December 21, 2002, killing both pilots. The cause was attributed to water-droplet size that was beyond Part 25, Appendix C of the FAA design certification. Aero Caribbean Flight 883 crashed on November 4, 2010, killing all 68 people on board. UTair Flight 120 crashed on April 2, 2012 because of a failure to deice the aircraft prior to takeoff, and 33 of the 43 people on board were killed.

A 2020 report from Flight Global described a 2016 icing incident with an ATR 72 involving a Jet Time flight for SAS during a domestic Bergen-Alesund service in Norway. Nobody was injured in the flight.

Dramatization
 This crash was featured in the Discovery Channel program The New Detectives in an episode titled "Witness to Terror." (The episode incorrectly indicates the number of victims killed on the flight as 72.)
 The crash was featured in the theatrical production Charlie Victor Romeo.
 The crash was featured in Season 7 of the Canadian documentary series Mayday in an episode titled "Frozen in Flight."
 The crash was briefly mentioned in an episode of Modern Marvels ("Sub Zero") on the History Channel.

See also

TransAsia Airways Flight 791 - another ATR 72 that crashed after a loss of control due to atmospheric icing.
Ice protection system

Notes

References

External links 

 , 340 pages)
 , 341 pages)
PlaneCrashInfo.Com entry on Flight 4184
Tv.Com – New Detectives: Witness to Terror (Details Flight 4184 investigation)
Site for Families and Friends of 4184

Aviation accidents and incidents in the United States in 1994
1994 in Indiana
Airliner accidents and incidents in Indiana
Airliner accidents and incidents caused by ice
1994 meteorology
Disasters in Indiana
4184
Accidents and incidents involving the ATR 72
Newton County, Indiana
October 1994 events in the United States
Aviation accidents and incidents caused by loss of control